Drmeni is a village in the Resen Municipality of North Macedonia, north of Lake Prespa. It has 416 residents as of the 2002 census.

Demographics
Drmeni is inhabited by Orthodox Macedonians and Muslim Turks. The Turkish population of Drmeni has declined at a much faster rate than that of the rest of the village population.

References

Villages in Resen Municipality